Lotte may refer to:

Businesses 
 Lotte Corporation, a South Korean industrial conglomerate
 Lotte Holdings, a Japanese holding company
 Lotte Capital, a South Korean financial company
 Lotte Card, a South Korean credit card provider
 Lotte Chilsung, a Korean manufacturer of food products
 Lotte Cinema, a chain of movie theatres in South Korea
 Lotte Confectionery, South Korean confectionery
 Lotte Department Store, a Korean Department Store
 Lotte Liquor, South Korean distiller
 Lotte World, a recreation complex in Seoul, South Korea

Entertainment 
 Lotte (film), a 1928 German silent film directed by Carl Froelich
 Lotte in Weimar, a 1975 East German drama film directed by Egon Günther and produced by DEFA
 Lotte (TV series), a Dutch TV series based on the Colombian telenovela Betty, la fea
 Lotte, the title character of a series of Estonian animated TV programs and films, including:
 Lotte from Gadgetville, a 2006 film
 Lotte and the Moonstone Secret, a 2011 film

Cities 
 Lotte, Germany, a municipality in North Rhine-Westphalia

People 
 Lotte (name), a feminine given name

Sport
Chiba Lotte Marines, a baseball team in Chiba City, Japan
Lotte Giants, a baseball team in Busan, South Korea
Sportfreunde Lotte, an association football club in Lotte, Germany

Fictional characters 
 Lotte, the object of Werther's affection in Goethe's The Sorrows of Young Werther
 Lotte Körner (Lottie Horn in the English translation), nine-year-old girl, one of the protagonists of Erich Kästner's novel Lottie and Lisa
 Lotte (Estonian literature), the main character in Estonian children book series and animated films
 Charlotte Buff (Lotte), the main character in Thomas Mann's 1939 novel Lotte in Weimar: The Beloved Returns
 Lotte Jansson, a main character in Little Witch Academia
 Lotte Weeda, a character in the eponymously titled 2004 novel by Dutch author Maarten 't Hart

Buildings
Lotte Center Hanoi
Lotte New York Palace Hotel
Lotte Shopping Avenue (a shopping centre that is part of the Ciputra World Jakarta complex in Jakarta, Indonesia)

See also

Lot (disambiguation)
Lott (disambiguation)
Lotta (disambiguation)
Lottie (disambiguation)
Lotty, a given name